Facetectomy is a surgical procedure which involves decompression of a spinal nerve root. For example, it can be performed in severely resistant cases of cervical rhizalgia, where the cervical nerve roots within the intervertebral foramina are decompressed.

References

Neurosurgery
Surgical removal procedures